The men's 400 metres hurdles event at the 2000 World Junior Championships in Athletics was held in Santiago, Chile, at Estadio Nacional Julio Martínez Prádanos on 18, 19 and 21 October.

Medalists

Results

Final
21 October

Semifinals
19 October

Semifinal 1

Semifinal 2

Heats
18 October

Heat 1

Heat 2

Heat 3

Heat 4

Participation
According to an unofficial count, 29 athletes from 23 countries participated in the event.

References

400 metres hurdles
400 metres hurdles at the World Athletics U20 Championships